Arteni is a village in the Aragatsavan Municipality of the Aragatsotn Province of Armenia.
The town contains a wine factory.

References 

World Gazeteer: Armenia – World-Gazetteer.com

Kiesling, Rediscovering Armenia, p. 20, available online at the US embassy to Armenia's website

Populated places in Aragatsotn Province